Veronica serpyllifolia, the thyme-leaved speedwell or thymeleaf speedwell, is a perennial flowering plant in the plantain family. It is native to Europe, but can be found elsewhere on most continents as an introduced species.

Description
Veronica serpyllifolia L. initially grows low to the ground then will start to grow upright. The flowers are small, white, and have dark purple marks on their petals. The leaves are oval, borne on creeping stems. Roots grow from leaf axils. The prostrate stems bear erect flowering branches up to 20 cm high. The leaves are opposite on short stalks. The flowers are in racemes with a corolla 6 mm wide.  The first leaves of the seedling have no petiole, are hairless, and have a smooth margin. Their stems grow from nodes on the rhizomes, allowing it to grow in thick mats close to the ground. The lower leaves are oval and have smooth margins. The upper leaves are oval shaped but smaller than the lower leaves. The lower leaves have relatively short stalks, while the higher or upper leaves are stalkless (lack petioles). Flowers have four petals and grow from the leaf axils. The fruits are capsules. The capsules are obcordate or heart shaped, mostly flattened and have a pubescent outer layer with a notched tip. Veronica serpyllifolia capsules are approximately 2.5-3.5 mm long. Once the capsules are mature, they open to release many small seeds. Their root systems are both fibrous and rhizomatous. The fruit is lined with hairs and the seeds on the inside of the capsule are also flattened. This plant can be hard to spot as it is relatively small and grows in patches which can be covered by grass. They are more noticeable when they bloom. Veronica serpyllifolia reproduces either by dropping its seeds or by rooting stems.

Distribution 

Veronica serpyllifolia L., commonly known as thyme-leaved speedwell, is native to Europe and is introduced to North America and New Zealand. As of 2010, it is known to occur in 37 of the US states and is considered a weed in North America. Veronica serpyllifolia frequently occurs in open grass lands and cultivated areas on lighter soils.  Veronica serpyllifolia grows in full sunlight, tolerates partial shade, and thrives in a moist environment during the spring . They can grow in elevations up to 3300 m.

Ecology 
Pollinators of V. serpyllifolia include flies and bees that visit the flowers for nectar.  The seeds can be dispersed by attaching onto the wings of birds or the fur of some animals. Veronica serpyllifolia seeds were found in cattle dung, thus cattle or other grazers are likely important dispersers of the plant.

Weed control 
Veronica serpyllifolia grows in patches and is commonly recognized as a weed of turf grass. Ways to remove V. serpyllifolia from lawns are by mowing and watering and fertilizing lawns properly, this hinders the weeds ability to compete. The use of herbicide is recommended for the complete removal of this species from a yard or a lawn. Picking the weed and pulling the roots out can work but this risks the further dispersal of seeds on the lawn. One study showed that wiping herbicides onto the plant rather than spraying it helps to better remove of the species. It stated that wiping method worked better and the spray on method caused harm to other grasses surrounding the weeds.

Synonyms 
Synonyms of Veronica serpyllifolia include: Veronicastrum serpyllifolium (L.) Fourr. and Veronica serpyllifolia L. var. nummularioides Lecoq & Lamotte.

Wetland plant status 
Veronica serpyllifolia is able to grow in both jurisdictional wetlands and non-wetlands. According the wetland plant classification system in the United States, V. serpyllifolia is classified as a facultative (FAC) to obligate (OBL) wetland plant.

References

External links

Native Plant Identification Network
Missouri Plants
Isle of Skye Flora

serpyllifolia
Plants described in 1753
Taxa named by Carl Linnaeus